Legion of Pain are a professional wrestling tag team consisting of Sunny Dhinsa and Gzim Selmani. They are best known for their time in WWE as the Authors of Pain, under the ring names Akam and Rezar, where they are former one-time Raw Tag Team Champions and one-time NXT Tag Team Champions.

Akam and Rezar first teamed up in June 2016, paired with manager Paul Ellering in WWE's then developmental league NXT. They won the Dusty Rhodes Tag Team Classic in 2016, leading to them winning the  NXT Tag Team Championship. In April 2018, Akam and Rezar were promoted to the Raw brand, with Drake Maverick taking over as their manager. AOP took a hiatus in early 2019. They returned later that year, but without Maverick as their manager, and later allying themselves with Seth Rollins. They were released in September 2020.

History

WWE (2016–2020)

NXT Tag Team Champions (2016–2018) 
The team made their televised NXT debut on June 8, 2016 at NXT TakeOver: The End, attacking American Alpha (Jason Jordan and Chad Gable) after they had lost the NXT Tag Team Championship to The Revival (Scott Dawson and Dash Wilder). Paul Ellering appeared on the ramp following the assault, signaling his association with the two.

On June 15 episode of NXT, they won their first televised match and were accompanied by Ellering. On November 19, the duo won the 2016 Dusty Rhodes Tag Team Classic, defeating TM-61 in the tournament final at NXT TakeOver: Toronto. On the January 11, 2017 episode of NXT, they assaulted #DIY (Johnny Gargano and Tommaso Ciampa) after they retained the NXT Tag Team Championship against The Revival.  At NXT TakeOver: San Antonio, they won the NXT Tag Team Championship by defeating #DIY. On the March 1 episode of NXT, The Authors of Pain defended their titles against #DIY in a rematch, which ended in a no contest after The Revival interfered and attacked both teams. They retained the titles at NXT TakeOver: Orlando by both defeating #DIY and The Revival in a triple threat elimination match after eliminating both teams.  At NXT TakeOver: Chicago, the duo participated in the first-ever ladder match for the NXT Tag Team Championship against #DIY, which they won.

On the July 26 episode of NXT, the two were set to compete, but their opponents were attacked by SAnitY before the match began. They then brawled with Alexander Wolfe and Killian Dain, disposing of the two before a staredown.  Two weeks later, SAnitY called out The Authors of Pain, who were attacked by Eric Young as they made their way down the ramp. Young zip-tied Rezar to the barricade, allowing SAnitY to beat down Akam. Rezar eventually made his way to the ring, but was ultimately attacked as well. At NXT TakeOver: Brooklyn III, The Authors of Pain lost the NXT Tag Team Championship to SAnitY, who were represented by Wolfe and Young after the latter replaced Killian Dain mid-match, marking their first loss in NXT. At NXT TakeOver: WarGames, they teamed with Roderick Strong in a WarGames match against SAnitY and The Undisputed Era (Adam Cole, Kyle O'Reilly, and Bobby Fish), who won the match. At NXT TakeOver: Philadelphia, The Authors of Pain unsuccessfully challenged The Undisputed Era for the NXT Tag Team Championship. In what was their last match in NXT, they again challenged The Undisputed Era for the NXT Tag Team Championship in a triple threat match also involving the team of Strong and WWE United Kingdom Champion Pete Dunne at NXT TakeOver: New Orleans, where they failed to win after Strong turned on Dunne and joined The Undisputed Era, allowing them to retain the titles.

Raw Tag Team Champions (2018–2019) 
On the April 9 episode of Raw, The Authors of Pain, along with Paul Ellering, made their main roster debut, defeating Heath Slater and Rhyno. After the match, Akam and Rezar ended their partnership with Ellering by pushing him away and leaving him ringside as they returned backstage. The Authors of Pain entered a brief feud with Titus Worldwide (Titus O'Neil and Apollo Crews), defeating them on the August 20 episode of Raw to end their feud. On the September 3 episode of Raw, The Authors of Pain, now under the shortened name of AOP, were accompanied to the ring by Drake Maverick, who announced himself as their new manager.

On the November 5 episode of Raw, AOP defeated Seth Rollins in a handicap match to win the Raw Tag Team Championship. At Survivor Series, they defeated SmackDown Tag Team Champions The Bar in an interbrand match. The following night on Raw, AOP suffered an upset loss to the team of Bobby Roode and Chad Gable, marking their first loss on the main roster. On the December 10 episode of Raw, they lost their tag titles to Roode and Gable in a three-on-two handicap match that also involved their manager Maverick, ending their reign at 35 days. After this, the team went on hiatus due to Akam having knee surgery in January 2019. Maverick would subsequently go in his own direction, maintaining his duties as the 205 Live General Manager and then chasing after the WWE 24/7 Championship introduced in May. AOP returned during the 51-Man Battle Royal at Super ShowDown on June 7, but they were both eliminated during the match.

On the September 16 episode of Raw, AOP, without Maverick, returned in a vignette, where they called out the tag team division for being soft and weak and announced their intentions of returning. The following week, they would attack Heath Slater and No Way Jose backstage. During the 2019 draft, AOP went undrafted, becoming free agents and able to choose which brand to sign with, however, three days after the draft's conclusion, AOP signed with Raw to remain on the brand.

Seth Rollins' enforcers (2019–2020) 
They made their in-ring return on the November 25 episode of Raw, defeating Curt Hawkins and Zack Ryder. Later that night, they interrupted the main event between Kevin Owens and Seth Rollins by attacking Owens, but refused to attack Rollins. On the December 9 episode of Raw, AOP joined forces with Rollins to attack Owens backstage, confirming their association. On the January 13, 2020 episode of Raw, Buddy Murphy would assist AOP and Rollins in their tag team match against Owens, Big Show and Samoa Joe, therefore aligning himself with the faction as their new member. On the March 9 episode of Raw, AOP along with Rollins and Murphy assaulted Owens backstage and later that same night they teamed with Rollins and Murphy to defeat The Street Profits and The Viking Raiders in what would be their final appearances in WWE.

On March 10, it was reported that Rezar suffered a biceps injury, therefore putting the team on hiatus. On September 4, both Akam and Rezar were released from their WWE contracts.

Independent circuit (2022–present) 
In May 2022, Sunny Dhinsa and Gzim Selmani, now known as Legion of Pain, have announced the launch of their professional wrestling promotion, Wrestling Entertainment Series (WES).

Other media
Akam and Rezar made their video game debut as playable characters with Paul Ellering appearing as their manager in WWE 2K18, they also appear as playable characters in WWE 2K19, WWE 2K20 and WWE 2K Battlegrounds.

Championship and accomplishments 
 Pro Wrestling Illustrated
 Ranked Akam No. 204 of the top 500 singles wrestlers in the PWI 500 in 2018
 Ranked Rezar No. 211 of the top 500 singles wrestlers in the PWI 500 in 2018
WWE
 NXT Tag Team Championship (1 time)
 WWE Raw Tag Team Championship (1 time)
 Dusty Rhodes Tag Team Classic (2016)

References

External links 
 
 

WWE teams and stables
WWE NXT teams and stables